Riverside Inn may refer to:

Riverside Inn (Cambridge Springs, Pennsylvania), hotel/dinner theater and listed on the National Register of Historic Places in Crawford County, Pennsylvania
Riverside Inn (Lava Hot Springs, Idaho), listed on the National Register of Historic Places in Bannock County, Idaho
Riverside Inn (Leland, Michigan), listed on the National Register of Historic Places in Leelanau County, Michigan
Riverside Inn (Oderberg, Germany), historic guest house in Barnim county, north east of Berlin

See also 
Riverside Hotel (disambiguation)